Addi Bâ Mamadou (25 December 1916 – 18 December 1943) was part of the French Resistance as a member of the first Maquis des Vosges during World War II, known to the Germans as "the Black Terrorist" (Der schwarze Terrorist).

Biography 
Addi Bâ arrived in France in 1938 with the family of a colonial tax collector and spent a year in Langeais in Indre-et-Loire before returning to Paris. He enlisted in the French army in 1939 as part of the 12th regiment of Senegalese Tirailleurs. Bâ was taken prisoner, but managed to escape and joined others in the maquis des Vosges. He was arrested on 18 November 1943 by Germans after the attack of the maquis of the Délivrance group. Bâ was tortured but did not speak. On 18 December 1943, Bâ was shot at Épinal along with the leader of the maquis, Marcel Arburger.

Legacy
On 13 July 2003, Bâ was posthumously awarded the Resistance Medal.

In 2010, the former footballer Lilian Thuram devoted a chapter to Addi Bâ in his work Mes étoiles noires ("My Black Stars") on historically important black individuals. Some extracts of this chapter were published on 4 September 2010 in the journal L'Humanité, as part of a feature titled "Portraits de résistants."

His life was recounted in a romanticised manner by Tierno Monénembo in his novel le Terroriste noir, published by éditions du Seuil in 2012.

In September 2013, Étienne Guillermond published Addi Bâ, résistant des Vosges, with éditions Duboiris, the result of ten years of research into the young Guinean.

A street in Tollaincourt and another in Langeais are named in his honour.

References

Bibliography 
 
 
 Lilian Thuram, with the collaboration of Bernard Fillaire, Mes étoiles noires, Éditions Philippe Rey, 2010

External links 
 Addi Bâ Mamadou, héros méconnu de la résistance
 Étienne Guillermond, "Sur les traces d'Addi Bâ, héros vosgien d'origine guinéenne," Hommes et migrations n° 1247, January-February 2004

1916 births
1943 deaths
Recipients of the Resistance Medal
People executed by Nazi Germany by firearm
Guinean emigrants to France